Salekhard (Khanty: , Pułñawat; , Saljaꜧ harad) is a town in Yamalo-Nenets Autonomous Okrug, Russia, serving as the okrug's administrative centre.

History
The settlement of Obdorsk was founded in 1595, in the place of a Khanty settlement called Polnovat-Vozh, by Russian settlers after the conquest of Siberia. It was situated on the Ob River, and its name supposedly derives from that. The land around Obdorsk was referred to as Obdorsky krai, or Obdoriya.

The town was often used as a place of exile during the Tsarist and Soviet periods. Among notable people who spent time here were the Doukhobor spiritual leader Pyotr Verigin and Leon Trotsky. The town and nearby area contained three Soviet camps where approximately 6,500 prisoners were held, arrested for their belief in God. At the port of Salekhard, approximately 1,500 prisoners loaded and unloaded goods at the dock, or mined metal ores. About 5,000 prisoners in two camps near Salekhard were assigned to polish diamonds mined from Mir mine.

The nearest railway station is at Labytnangi on the opposite side of the river Ob. From 1949 to 1953, the Salekhard-Igarka Railway project made an unsuccessful attempt to extend the line to Igarka, claiming the lives of thousands of Gulag prisoners. The section of railway from Salekhard to Nadym was completed and remained in use for some time in the Soviet era, although it was later abandoned. It is currently being rebuilt, along with a long-awaited bridge across the Ob between Labytnangi and Salekhard.

Salekhard was the host city for the 2006 Arctic Council Ministerial Meeting in October 2006.

In April 2014, Rostelecom, a Russian Internet service provider, completed the final stretch of the Nadym-Salekhard optical Internet line. That same line stretches for almost .

In the Summer of 2016, temperatures as high as  thawed anthrax-infected corpses that were frozen since the soviet era near Salekhard, causing anthrax spores to infect reindeer herds and herders.

Administrative and municipal status

Within the framework of administrative divisions, it is, together with one rural locality, incorporated as the town of okrug significance of Salekhard—an administrative unit with the status equal to that of the districts. As a municipal division, the town of okrug significance of Salekhard is incorporated as Salekhard Urban Okrug.

Demographics
Ethnic composition (2010):
 Russians – 65%
 Tatars – 9%
 Ukrainians – 6.2%
 Khanty – 3.3%
 Nenets – 3%
 Komi – 2.7%
 Kyrgyz – 1%
 Others – 9.8%

Economy

Yamal Airlines has its head office in Salekhard. Most of residents are employed in reindeer herding, fishing and the services sector.

Transportation

Salekhard is located in the Ob river valley and is an important river port of the Russian Far North. The unfinished Salekhard–Igarka Railway was set to provide a rail connection between the Ob river port of Salekhard and the Yenisei river port of Igarka. The project Northern Latitudinal Railway will provide Salekhard access to Russian railway and will further connect Salekhard to the Konosha–Vorkuta railway and other parts of European Russia. The Salekhard Bridge project, a combined railway-road bridge over Ob river, is the main component of Northern Latitudinal Railway that will connect Labytnangi and Salekhard is to be constructed with the cost of 60 billion rubles. Nadym–Salekhard road, a 344 km long road, was inaugurated in December 2020 to the 90th anniversary of the Yamalo-Nenets Autonomous Okrug, it will facilate the construction of a railway between the two cities and connects the eastern and western parts of Yamal Okrug. For 9–10 months each year, the Ob river is frozen and cars and trucks can cross via the river ice. In the summer a ferry operates, however during the floating of ice, generally shortly before the start and shortly after the end of summer, Salekhard is effectively isolated from the outside world, regarding freight. During these periods, only helicopters are able to reach Salekhard in case of emergency. Native people, mainly the Nenets and Khanty people, always build up stocks of food at home, in the shops, and in the markets during this period, but they still suffer from seasonal inflation.

Climate

Salekhard has a subarctic climate (Köppen climate classification Dfc) with short, mild summers and severely cold winters. Precipitation is moderate, and is significantly greater in summer than in winter.

Gallery

International relations

Twin Town & Sister City
Salekhard is twinned with:
Azov, Rostov Oblast, Russia

Notable people
 

Ion-Georgy Kostev (born 1990), professional ice hockey player

See also

References

Notes

Sources

External links
 Official website of Salekhard
Official website of Yamalo-Nenets Autonomous Okrug. Information about Salekhard

 
Populated places established in 1595
Populated places of Arctic Russia
Populated places on the Ob River